Arrington Township is located in Wayne County, Illinois, United States. As of the 2010 census, its population was 409 and it contained 193 housing units.

Geography

Demographics

References

External links
City-data.com
Illinois State Archives

Townships in Wayne County, Illinois
Townships in Illinois